The 2016–17 FIBA Europe Cup was the 2nd season of the FIBA Europe Cup, a European basketball club competition organised by FIBA Europe. The season began on 18 October 2016, with the regular season, and concluded on April 25, 2017, with the second leg of the Finals. Nanterre 92 was crowned FIBA Europe Cup champions after defeating Élan Chalon.

Format changes
The regular season phase 1 will be joined by 38 teams, 26 will qualify directly and the other 12 will come from the Basketball Champions League qualifying rounds. These teams will be divided into ten groups, seven groups of four teams and three groups of three teams. The two first qualified teams of each group and the four best third-placed teams (two teams from each Conference) will qualify to the regular season phase 2. These teams will be divided into six groups of four teams. The first qualified teams of each group and the best two runners-up of all groups will qualify to the play-offs with the eight teams dropped from the Basketball Champions League regular season.

In the play-offs, the Round of 16 play-offs, the Quarter-Final play-offs, the Semi-Final play-offs and the Final play-offs will be played with a double-leg format.

After the Basketball Champions League expansion, the qualifying rounds were eliminated and the four teams that were going to join them qualified directly to the regular season, being these reduced to 38 teams instead of the 40 initially proposed.

Team allocation

A total of 38 teams will participate in the 2016–17 FIBA Europe Cup.

Distribution
The table below shows the default access list.

Teams
The official list of teams was announced with the draw on 22 July.

The labels in the parentheses show how each team qualified for the place of its starting round. 
2nd, 3rd, 4th, etc.: League position after eventual Playoffs
CL: Transferred from Champions League
RS: Fifth-placed and sixth-placed teams from regular season
QR: Losers from qualifying rounds

Round and draw dates
The schedule of the competition is as follows:

Regular season

The draw of the regular season was held on 22 July 2016, at 12:00 CEST, in Freising, Germany.
The 38 teams were divided into two conferences according to geographical criteria, each containing five groups:
Conference 1: Groups A, B and D (four teams); Groups C and E (three teams)
Conference 2: Groups F, G, H and J (four teams); Group I (three teams)

The matchdays were 19 October, 26 October, 2 November, 9 November, 16 November and 23 November 2016. The top two teams of each group and the four best third-placed teams of all groups (two from each conference) advanced to the second round. 

A total of 22 national associations were represented in the regular season. Hubo Limburg United, Basic-Fit Brussels and Peja made their European debut appearances.

Tiebreakers
If teams in the same group finish tied on points at the end of the Regular Season, tiebreakers were applied in the following order:
 Head-to-head record.
 Head-to-head point differential.
 Point differential during the regular season.
 Points scored during the regular season.
 Sum of quotients of points scored and points allowed in each regular season match.

Conference 1

Group A

Group B

Group C

Group D

Group E

Conference 2

Group F

Group G

Group H

Group I

Group J

Ranking of third-placed teams
Games against fourth-placed teams are not included in these rankings.

Conference 1

Conference 2

Second round
The matchdays were 14 December, 21 December 2016, 4 January, 11 January, 18 January and 25 January 2017. The six group winners plus the two best second-placed teams qualified directly for the play-offs, where they were joined by eight teams transferred from the Basketball Champions League regular season.

Group K

Group L

Group M

Group N

Group O

Group P

Ranking of second-placed teams

Transfers from Champions League regular season
Eight teams from the 2016–17 Basketball Champions League Regular season transfer to the FIBA Europe Cup. These include the worst fifth-placed team, all sixth-placed teams and the two best seventh-placed teams.

Play-offs

Unlike the previous season, every round of the play-offs, including the finals, will be played as two-legged home-and-away ties.

Bracket

Round of 16
The first legs will be played on 8 February, and the second legs will be played on 22 February 2017.

Quarter-finals
The first legs will be played on 8 March, and the second legs will be played on 15 March 2017.

Semi-finals
The first legs will be played on 29 March, and the second legs will be played on 5 April 2017.

Final

The first leg will be played on 18 April, and the second leg will be played on 25 April 2017.

Honors

Top performers
Each week a selection of five top performers was made, based on their efficiency rating. The Top Performer title is handed out by the official website of the FIBA Europe Cup and partly decided by efficiency rating in the particular round.

Regular season

Second round

Round of 16

Quarter-finals

Semi-finals

Final

Statistics

Statistical leaders

Source: FIBA Europe Cup

Individual game highs

Source: FIBA Europe Cup

Finals rosters
 Nanterre 92: Spencer Butterfield, Chris Warren, Heiko Schaffartzik, Hugo Invernizzi. Coach: Pascal Donnadieu 
 Elan Chalon: Cameron Clark, Moustapha Fall, John Robertson, Jérémy Nzeulie, Lance Harris, Bouteille.

See also
2016–17 EuroLeague
2016–17 EuroCup Basketball
2016–17 Basketball Champions League

References

External links
 

 
FIBA Europe Cup